Malcolm Walter Atwell (born 5 March 1937) is a former Australian rules football player and coach. He played for East Perth and Perth in the West Australian National Football League (WANFL).

Playing career
Atwell was a tough, hard hitting footballer and spent most of his time as either a defender or in the ruck.

He started his career in 1958 at East Perth and played in their premiership team that season as well as the next. After 162 games with East Perth, he transferred to Perth where he played 76 games.

After making his interstate debut in 1960, Atwell represented his state in both the 1961 Brisbane Carnival and 1966 Hobart Carnivals. In all he made 17 interstate appearances and coached his state at the 1969 Adelaide Carnival.

Coaching career
He had a highly successful stint as Perth coach and was later named as the coach of Perth's official Team of the Century.

From 1966 to 1969 he was captain-coach of Perth and led them to premierships in 1966, 1967 and 1968. He remained coach for the 1970 and 1971 seasons but retired as a player.

The following year he joined South Fremantle as non-playing coach and spent two seasons in the role.

Footnotes

References

1937 births
Living people
Australian rules footballers from Western Australia
East Perth Football Club players
Perth Football Club players
Perth Football Club coaches
South Fremantle Football Club coaches
Perth Football Club administrators
West Australian Football Hall of Fame inductees